Frits Thaulow (20 October 1847 – 5 November 1906) was a Norwegian Impressionist painter, best known for his naturalistic depictions of landscape.

Biography

Johan Frederik Thaulow was born in Christiania, the son of a wealthy chemist, Harald Conrad Thaulow (1815–1881), and Nicoline ("Nina") Louise Munch (1821–1894). Thaulow was educated at the Academy of Art in Copenhagen in 1870–1872, and from 1873 until 1875 he studied with Hans Gude at the Baden School of Art in Karlsruhe.

Thaulow was one of the earliest artists to paint in Skagen in the north of Jutland, soon to become famous for its Skagen Painters. He arrived there in 1879 with his friend Christian Krohg, who persuaded him to spend the summer and autumn there. They arrived from Norway in Thaulow's little boat. Thaulow, who had specialized in marine painting, turned to Skagen's favorite subjects, the fishermen and the boats on the shore.

After his stay in Skagen, Thaulow returned to Norway in 1880. He became one of the leading young figures in the Norwegian art scene, together with Christian Krohg and Erik Werenskiold, and he helped establish the first National Art Exhibit (also known as Høstutstillingen or Autumn Exhibit) in 1882. Many of Thaulow's best-known Norwegian scenes are from Åsgårdstrand, which had become an important center for artists and painters dating from the 1880s.

Thaulow moved to France in 1892, living there until his death in 1906. He soon discovered that the cityscapes of Paris did not suit him. His best paintings were made in small towns such as Montreuil-sur-Mer (1892–94), Dieppe and surrounding villages (1894–98), Quimperle in Brittany (1901) and Beaulieu-sur-Dordogne in the Corrèze département (1903). One of his most famous works made after he moved to France was A village street in France.
 In Dieppe Thaulow and his wife Alexandra made themselves popular: they were friends with artist Charles Conder, and they met Aubrey Beardsley. 

Thaulow received a number of honors for his artistic activity, including his appointment as commander of the 2nd Royal Norwegian Order of St. Olav in 1905. He received the French Legion of Honor, the Order of Saints Maurice and Lazarus from Italy and the Order of Nichan Iftikhar from Tunisia. He died in Volendam, in The Netherlands. The National Gallery of Norway features 37 of his works. Other prominent displays include the Hermitage Museum in St. Petersburg, the Museum of Fine Arts in Boston and the Busch-Reisinger Museum at Harvard University.

Personal life

Thaulow was married twice. In 1874 he married Ingeborg Charlotte Gad (1852–1908).  The marriage dissolved in 1886. In 1886, he married Alexandra Lasson (1862–1955), the daughter of Carl Lasson (1830–1893), a noted  Norwegian attorney. He had three children with his second wife: Harald Thaulow (1887–1971), Ingrid Thaulow (1892–1983) and Christian Lasson Thaulow (1895–1944).

Selected gallery

References

Other sources

 Pakenham, Simona. Sixty Miles from England: The English at Dieppe 1814-1914, (London, Macmillan, 1967).
 Poulsson, Vidar  Frits Thaulow: 1847-1906 (B.A. Mathisen. 1992) 
 Poulsson, Vidar; Thune, Richard M. Frits Thaulow (Hirschl & Adler Galleries; 1985)
 Haverkamp, Frode  (trans. Joan Fuglesang) Hans Fredrik Gude: From National Romanticism to Realism in Landscape (Aschehoug. 1992)

External links

 Kulturnett.no
 Small town square , Fritz Thaulow on the official website of the Musée Rodin.
 Alexandra Lasson on Geni

1847 births
1906 deaths
Recipients of the Order of Saints Maurice and Lazarus
Officiers of the Légion d'honneur
Norwegian landscape painters
Norwegian Impressionist painters
Artists from Oslo
Skagen Painters
19th-century Norwegian painters
19th-century male artists
20th-century Norwegian painters
Norwegian male painters
20th-century male artists